MV Edmund Gardner is a retired pilot cutter built for the Liverpool Pilot Service after the Second World War. She was decommissioned after nearly 30 years service converted to a museum ship as part of the Merseyside Maritime Museum.

Service career
Edmund Gardner was ordered by the Mersey Docks and Harbour Board in July 1951 as a replacement for the pre-war steam powered cutters which were nearing the end of their usefulness.

Edmund Gardner (cutter no.2) was one of three such vessels, and was/each being named for a past chairman of the board. Her sister-ships were Thomas Brocklebank (cutter no.1) and Arnet Robinson (cutter no.3)

Edmund Gardner was built by Philip and Son, of Dartmouth, and was launched on 9 July 1953. She was completed and entered service on the Mersey on 2 December 1953.

Her function was to serve as a floating base for pilots guiding ships into and out of the Mersey. She would remain one week at the Liverpool Bar, followed by one week at Point Lynas, Anglesey, and then serve one week as supply ship to the other two. While on station her function was to meet ships entering the Mersey en route to the Liverpool Docks or the Manchester Ship Canal, and transfer the pilot for the transit of the waterway, or to collect pilots from outgoing vessels. 
During that period the Mersey was still a busy waterway; On an average day, such as 15 April 1960, Edmund Gardner met and transferred pilots for 16 ships (10 inbound and 6 outbound) in one 8-hour period.

During her 28 years of successful service Edmund Gardner suffered only one incident; in 1963 she was involved in a mild collision with ore carrier Iron Horse, but suffered no serious damage.

Later history
In April 1981 Edmund Gardner was de-commissioned; in 1982 she was purchased for the museum, one of only two such ships in preservation. Today she is located in the Canning Graving Dock, across the dock from the Maritime Museum and  adjacent to the Museum of Liverpool Life.

In 2014 Edmund Gardner was selected for use as a "dazzle ship", an art installation organized by the Imperial War Museum's 14-18 NOW project. In conjunction with Liverpool Biennial and Tate Liverpool, Edmund Gardner was re-painted with a design by artist Carlos Cruz-Diez entitled Induction Chromatique à Double Fréquence, and inspired by the dazzle camouflage developed and used during the  First World War.

References

External links
Edmund Gardner at Merseyside Maritime Museum
 Edmund Gardner at National Historic Ships UK

River Mersey
Ships built in Dartmouth
1953 ships
Museum ships in the United Kingdom
Ships and vessels of the National Historic Fleet